William Ross (1874 – after 1907) was an English footballer who scored 62 goals from 234 appearances in the Football League playing for Sheffield United, Lincoln City, Notts County, Grimsby Town and Glossop. A centre forward, he also played non-league football for Kiveton Park, Chesterfield Town, Gravesend United and Reading.

Notes

References

1874 births
Year of death missing
People from Kiveton Park
English footballers
Association football goalkeepers
Kiveton Park F.C. players
Chesterfield F.C. players
Sheffield United F.C. players
Lincoln City F.C. players
Gravesend United F.C. players
Reading F.C. players
Notts County F.C. players
Grimsby Town F.C. players
Glossop North End A.F.C. players
English Football League players
Southern Football League players
Date of birth missing
Place of death missing